"Shorty" is a song by American rock band The Get Up Kids. The single was self-funded, and was a major catalyst for the band's early success, gaining the attention of several record labels including the band's future label Doghouse Records.

History
In 1995, after the band first formed, Matt Pryor and Rob Pope saved for several months in order to record their first 7". In 1996, they recorded the record, produced by Mike Mogis of Bright Eyes, and his brother A.J., who were major players in the midwest emo scene at the time. The release of the record brought a great deal of attention to the band from several labels including Contrast Records, Doghouse Records and Slash Records, an imprint of Elektra Records.  However, the band didn't want to sign to a major label too early, so they instead signed to Doghouse Records, who gave them a two-album deal and $4,000 to record their first album. The release also got the attention of producer Ed Rose, who went on to produce their EP Woodson, the band's first release on a major label.

"Shorty" also caused a good deal of shakeup within the band. After the release brought attention to the band, they decided that they wanted to start touring. However, drummer Nathan Shay wanted to focus on his schooling at the Kansas City Art Institute, which eventually led to him quitting the band. He was soon replaced by Rob's brother Ryan Pope.

Track listing

Additional Releases
 The song "Shorty" was re-recorded for the band's debut album Four Minute Mile, released in its original format on the B-sides and rarities collection Eudora, and on their live album Live! @ The Granada Theater.
 The song "The Breathing Method" was re-released on the band's B-sides and rarities collection Eudora.

Personnel
Band
 Matt Pryor - Vocals, guitar
 Jim Suptic - Guitar, backing vocals
 Rob Pope - Bass
 Nathan Shay - Drums, backing vocals ("The Breathing Method")
Production
 Mike Mogis - Production
 A.J. - Production, mixing

References

The Get Up Kids songs
1996 debut singles
1996 songs